Robin Jacobsson (born August 10, 1986) is a Swedish former professional ice hockey player who last played in the HockeyAllsvenskan (Allsv) for AIK IF.

He made his Elitserien debut playing with Luleå HF during the 2012–13 season.

References

External links

1986 births
Living people
AIK IF players
Brynäs IF players
Graz 99ers players
Hammarby Hockey (1921–2008) players
KooKoo players
Leksands IF players
Luleå HF players
Nybro Vikings players
Swedish ice hockey defencemen
Tingsryds AIF players
VIK Västerås HK players
Ice hockey people from Stockholm